The Lebrade Pond Bird Sanctuary is a nature reserve in the north German state of Schleswig-Holstein, that lies within the district of Plön, about 7 kilometres north of the town of Plön. It has been designated as a Special Area of Conservation and therefore is part of the Natura 2000 network. It has a length of about 1.7 kilometres and a width of about one kilometre.

History 
The lakes were artificially laid out in the 17th century as fish ponds by the Rixdorf Estate for keeping and breeding carp. Today the large, very flat, drainable pond system continues to be extensively used, but it is no longer stocked with fish. The charitable Marius Böger Foundation for nature conservation and regional studies has rented the area. In winter the ponds are drained.

Flora 
The area is a group of natural eutrophic lakes that are of international importance for the conservation of migratory water birds. Next to the lakes are areas with a succession of vegetation types from reed beds, willows and wetlands to carr and bog.

Fauna 
In the area of the pond and succession growth there are in places rare breeding birds like the gadwall, mute swan and grebe. In addition, protected amphibians like the moor frog and the European fire-bellied toad are also found here.

Use 
The L53 district road runs Lebrade to Sellin through the area. Stopping en route is not permitted, but there is a good overview of the nature reserve from the road. There is an observation point in the northern part of the village of Lebrade. From here it is possible to have a good view of the birds in the area. In addition there is an information board here with details about the nature reserve and the birds to be found. The reserve has no footpath access.

References

External links

 Lebrade Pond Bird Sanctuary, brochure and map (pdf; 1.4 MB) 

Nature reserves in Schleswig-Holstein
Plön (district)
Ponds of Schleswig-Holstein